"Prayer For You" is the fourth and final single to be taken from the album Southside by Scottish band Texas. Despite a variety of formats it failed to make the UK Singles Chart Top 40 - only managing to reach #73.

Track listing

CD1 (TEX CD4) 
"Prayer For You" - 4:47
"I Don't Want a Lover" (Live) - 6:29
"Return" - 3:10
"Prayer For You" (Acoustic Version) - 3:41

"I Don't Want a Lover" was recorded live at the Paradiso in Amsterdam.

CD2 'Remixes' (TXCDR 4) 
"Prayer For You" (Southside Remix) - 5:19
"Prayer For You" (Northside Remix) - 6:51

Charts

References 

1989 singles
Texas (band) songs
Songs written by Johnny McElhone
Songs written by Sharleen Spiteri
Phonogram Records singles
1989 songs